The black-necked wattle-eye (Platysteira chalybea) is a species of bird in the family Platysteiridae. It is found in Angola, Cameroon, Equatorial Guinea, and Gabon. Its natural habitats are subtropical or tropical moist lowland forest, subtropical or tropical swamps, and subtropical or tropical moist montane forest.

References

black-necked wattle-eye
Birds of Central Africa
black-necked wattle-eye
Taxonomy articles created by Polbot
Taxobox binomials not recognized by IUCN